The EuroLeague Final Four is the final four format championship of the European-wide top-tier level EuroLeague professional club basketball competition. The Euroleague Basketball Company used the final four format for the first time in 2002, following the 2001 FIBA SuproLeague Final Four, which was the last final four held by FIBA Europe. In the original FIBA Europe competition, as seen below, the final four was used for the first time at the 1966 FIBA European Champions Cup Final Four. The final four format was used again the next year, with the 1967 FIBA European Champions Cup Final Four, but was then abandoned.

The final four finally returned as the format of choice, for the first time during its modern era, with the 1988 FIBA European Champions Cup Final Four. It is known as the Turkish Airlines EuroLeague Final Four for name sponsorship reasons. Panathinaikos has been the most successful team at the EuroLeague Final Four, since the modern final four era began in the 1987–88 season, winning the title 6 times (1996, 2000, 2002, 2007, 2009, 2011).

The EuroLeague Final Four is broadcast on TV in up to 213 countries and territories.

History

Names of the Final Four
FIBA era (1958–2001):
FIBA European Champions Cup Final Four (1966–1967, 1988–1991)
FIBA European League Final Four ("FIBA EuroLeague Final Four") (1992–1996)
FIBA EuroLeague Final Four (1997–2000)
FIBA SuproLeague Final Four (2001)
Euroleague Basketball era (since 2000):
Euroleague Final Four (2002–2016)
EuroLeague Final Four (since 2017)

Historical changes
The first time the EuroLeague used a Final Four format to decide its league champion, was at the conclusion of the 1965–66 and 1966–67 seasons, when it held the 1966 FIBA European Champions Cup Final Four, and the 1967 FIBA European Champions Cup Final Four. Those first two final fours were won by Simmenthal Milano (1966) and Real Madrid (1967). FIBA Europe did not use the final four format again until the 1987–88 season, when it held the 1988 FIBA European Champions Cup Final Four, which was also won by Tracer Milano.

The EuroLeague Final Four has been held every year since, with FIBA Europe organizing it until 2001, and the Euroleague Basketball Company organizing it since 2002.

There were two separate competitions during the 2000–01 season. The SuproLeague, which was organized by FIBA, and the EuroLeague, which was organized by Euroleague Basketball Company. Euroleague Basketball Company's EuroLeague competition, in its inaugural year, used a playoff format, with the two professional teams from Bologna (Virtus and Fortitudo), AEK, and TAU reaching the tournament's semifinals. Virtus was the winner of the 2001 Euroleague Finals.

EuroLeague Final Four by season

* The 2000–01 season was a transition year, with the best European teams split into two different major leagues, the SuproLeague 2000–01, held by FIBA, and the Euroleague 2000–01, held by Euroleague Basketball. That season's Euroleague Basketball tournament, the Euroleague 2000–01 season, did not end with a Final Four tournament. Instead, it ended with a 5-game playoff series. The EuroLeague now officially recognizes both the 2001 FIBA SuproLeague, and the 2001 Euroleague, in its statistics.

Statistics

Performance by club
 Including original FIBA European Champions Cup and EuroLeague Final Four competitions.

Performance by nation 
 Including original FIBA European Champions Cup and EuroLeague Final Four competitions.

Opening press conference venues

EuroLeague Final Four MVPs

EuroLeague All-Final Four Team

EuroLeague Final Four records

See also
EuroLeague
EuroLeague Finals

Notes

References

External links
 EuroLeague Official Web Page
 InterBasket EuroLeague Basketball Forum
 TalkBasket EuroLeague Basketball Forum
 

Final Four